Events from the year 1754 in Canada.

Incumbents
French Monarch: Louis XV
British and Irish Monarch: George II

Governors
Governor General of New France: Michel-Ange Duquesne de Menneville
Colonial Governor of Louisiana: Louis Billouart
Governor of Nova Scotia: Peregrine Hopson
Commodore-Governor of Newfoundland: Hugh Bonfoy

Events
 1754–63 - French and Indian War (the colonial phase of Europe's Seven Years' War)
 Anthony Henday travels west from Hudson Bay onto Plains, meets natives on horseback and sees Rocky Mountains.
 French and Indian War begins in North America; it becomes the Seven Years' War when fighting spreads to Europe (1756).
 Hudson's Bay Company Anthony Hendry travels to upper South Saskatchewan River, to Ft. La Jonquiere region with presents and trade goods.
 France sends 3,000 regulars to Canada. Fort Duquesne is built. Benjamin Franklin says the British Colonies will have no peace while France holds Canada. Ango-French competition in the Ohio Valley sparks conflict.
 George Washington's troops at Fort Duquesne open the French and Indian War, a counterpart of the Seven Years' War in Europe.
 Tuesday May 28: Washington, with a few men, attacks Jumonville, with thirty followers, near the confluence of the Monongahela and Ohio Rivers. Jumonville and nine of his command are killed. The rest are taken, prisoners.  The French allege that, before the firing began, Jumonville signaled that he had a proposal to make; but Washington says that he observed no signal.

Births
March - William Osgoode, judge (died 1824) 
June 1 - John Saunders, soldier, lawyer, politician and Chief Justice of New Brunswick (died 1834)
July 30 - Ward Chipman, lawyer, public servant, politician (died 1824) 
November 5 - Alessandro Malaspina, explorer (died 1810)

Deaths
 May 28 - Joseph Coulon de Jumonville, military officer. (born 1718)

Historical documents
British not disposed to negotiating with French until they (among other things) give up parts of Nova Scotia they have taken

New York asks Six Nations to treaty talks, but they delay over concerns about land, Ohio fighting and (false) smallpox news from Albany

Convention at Albany of colonial officials hears from Indigenous leaders before drawing up plan for union of British colonies

Albany Plan of Union would end weakness of disunity, create protective colonies on Great Lakes and regulate "Indian" trade and purchases

Apparently, British government planned combined operations against French on Ohio River, and at Niagara, Crown Point and Fort Beauséjour

Strategic analysis suggests attacks on French at Niagara and Crown Point, rather than Ohio, as easiest and cheapest

France wants New York most because of its proximity to Canada and its Lake Ontario trade route, and (from French intelligence) its weaknesses

"Under no kind of discipline" - British colonial troops practice "licentiousness, under the notion of liberty," toward authority

Timeline of preparations for war against French in New England and Nova Scotia

Acadians will not have to bear arms because British constitution "makes it both unsafe & unprecedented" for Catholics to do so

Officer at Annapolis warned not to trust treacherous Le Loutre, but stay open to peaceful intentions under treaty with Kopit

"Would be much better[...]that they were away" - Charles Lawrence details Acadians' non-compliance, but also their "ill humour" toward French

Lawrence recommends demolishing Fort Beauséjour and moving nearby Acadians either within Nova Scotia or "totally away by Fire and Sword"

"Too insolent and absurd" - Le Loutre's take on current affairs and list of Mi'kmaw demands are rejected by N.S. Council (Note: "savages" used)

Control of "corn" (grain) sales will divert it from Beauséjour and estranged Saint John River area and toward underserved Halifax market

Council agrees to aid Acadian families' return home after their unsuccessful exodus to Cape Breton at Le Loutre's urging

On staff of Fort Beauséjour, spy for British reports on Le Loutre's intimidation of parishioners

To thwart French seduction, New York Indian affairs commissioners want each of Six Nations to draw its dispersed members into one "castle"

Cayuga sachems say that if rum is made available to them, "they Cannot Remain A Nation" and will relocate to Canada, where rum is prohibited

"Trembling alive with fear" - New Hampshire woman begins account of captivity among Indigenous people in Canada (Note: "savages" used)

References 

 
Canada
54